Jakob Sølvhøj (born 12 September 1954 in Helsingør) is a Danish politician, who is a member of the Folketing for the Red–Green Alliance political party. He was elected at the 2015 Danish general election.

Political career
Sølvhøj was first elected in the 2015 election, where he received 753 votes. Despite the relatively low vote count, this was enough to guarantee Sølvhøj one of the Red-Green Alliance's levelling seats. The same happened in 2019, where Sølvhøj received 913 votes.

References

External links 
 Biography on the website of the Danish Parliament (Folketinget)

1954 births
Living people
People from Helsingør
Red–Green Alliance (Denmark) politicians
Members of the Folketing 2015–2019
Members of the Folketing 2019–2022